Beta Phi Alpha was a national collegiate sorority operating under that name in the United States from 1919 until 1941. It was absorbed by Delta Zeta sorority.

History 
The group had a succession of names. Through future name changes, the Fraternity continued to count its Founders Day as 8 May 1909. The Founders were:
Edith May Harriman
Elsa Erva Meta Ludeke
Anna Belle Nelson
Hattie Belle Paul
Ida Luise Rinn
Lydia Maude Taylor

In 1912, the name changed to Aldebaran, after the star. This change, and an expanded symbolism, mark the point where interest began among members for expansion to other campus groups.

On 24 Nov, 1919, the group chose to rename themselves as a Greek letter organization with the name Kappa Phi Alpha (University of California Chronicle, p. 38). But within a year, discovering that a men's fraternity in Boston had been operating under those letters, in 1920, the sorority took on its final name, Beta Phi Alpha. The 1919 date appears to be the juncture where the group, now solidly interested in connecting with other campus organizations, began to establish structures that would aid such growth. This process was led by Mary Gordon Holway, who wrote the ritual and advocated for a Greek letter identity.

Beta Phi Alpha then began the process of nationalization and expansion. In 1923, it was granted membership in the National Panhellenic Conference. Expansion was often effected by the absorption of local chapters or restless chapters of struggling non-NPC sororities. One of these was a five-year old local at the University of Minnesota called Zeta Alpha that became the Kappa chapter of Beta Phi Alpha in 1927. A total of thirty-five chapters were installed by 1936, but only a portion of them survived due to the economic downturn of the Great Depression.  For example, in 1936, two of the six chapters of a small national sorority called Phi Delta affiliated with Beta Phi Alpha, creating chapters at New York University and George Washington University. But it appears these did not survive, as five years later they were not reflected in the final chapter list at the time of merger with Delta Zeta.

On 22 June 1941, Beta Phi Alpha joined in a friendly merger with Delta Zeta sorority (Miner, pp. 144– 145).  gained eight undergraduate chapters from the merger.

Legacy 
Beta Phi Alpha's Convention Lights is still sung at the close of Delta Zeta national conventions.

The gavel which opens Delta Zeta's convention is an artifact of Beta Phi Alpha. It was given to Beta Phi Alpha by Founder Elsa Ludeke. The gavel is inscribed with the names of both sororities' founders and national presidents (Miner, pp. 144– 145).

Final Benedictory 
 The Final Benedictory (~blessing) was given by Julia Wells Bower at the last Beta Phi Alpha convention in 1941:

"Sisters in Beta Phi Alpha, we have long traveled a star-lit road together. We have given loving service, have formed priceless friendships, and have learned true wisdom as we traveled that road. Now the warm glow of a brightly burning Lamp joins the soft radiance of our star to light our path. May we be worthy bearers of the Lamp as we are faithful followers of the star!" (Miner, p. 144)

Creed 
The Creed of Beta Phi Alpha was:

We believe in service, the keynote of our daily lives, the foundation of our Fraternity and its power to reveal the worth of woman. We believe in knowledge and its broadening influence, in understanding and unselfish love as the creators of our happiness.

We pray for grace to meet success with humility, for strength and courage to rise above failure with spirit renewed, for wisdom to judge man by the spiritual values he may possess. We strive to keep faith in ourselves. We believe in the brotherhood of man and in our kinship to God, our Creator. (Miner, p. 145)

Insignia 

Delta Zeta's history book (1983) described the insignia as follows:

The badge "was a pearled  with Greek letters  and  embossed on a field of black enamel at either side of the 's stem".

Colors were Kelly green and gold.

The flower was the yellow tea rose.

The open motto was Scientia, Virtus, Amicitia - "Knowledge, Virtue, Friendship"

The publication was Aldebaran.

Chapters 
Baird's Manual (1940) notes that more than thirty chapters were established "with a total membership of 3,295." Inactive chapters at the time of merger listed in italic. Delta Zeta's history (1983) notes that a total of eight new chapters were gained in the merger, with some groups combined and one released:

References 

Baird's Manual of American College Fraternities (multiple volumes, with an online article here: The Baird's Manual Online Archive homepage.)
Miner, Florence Hood (1983). Delta Zeta Sorority 1902- 1982: Building on Yesterday, Reaching for Tomorrow. Delta Zeta Sorority, Comploith Graphics, Muary Boyd and Associates, Inc., Indianapolis, Indiana.
University of California, University of California Chronicle, University of California Press, 1920, v. 22.

Delta Zeta
Defunct fraternities and sororities
Defunct former members of the National Panhellenic Conference
1919 establishments in California
Student organizations established in 1919